The Size Of Food is an album by New Zealand band Jean-Paul Sartre Experience, released in 1989. It was released via Flying Nun Records.

The album was rereleased by Fire Records as part of its I Like Rain: The Story of The Jean-Paul Sartre Experience box set.

Critical reception
Trouser Press wrote that "while it has its share of Kiwi brilliance ... it also contains some distracting experiments that find the band flirting needlessly with art-rock and dance motifs." The Guardian called the band "often-overlooked," praising "Inside and Out" from the "excellent" The Size of Food. Blurt called "Elemental" the highlight, writing that "the whole album is very strong."

Track listing

Inside & Out - 03:55
Elemental - 04:14
Slip - 03:11
Shadows - 04:01
Get My Point - 05:16
Gravel - 03:14
Thrills - 05:21
Window - 04:46

Personnel
 Dave Yetton - guitar, vocals, bass, assorted sounds 
 David Mulcahy - guitar, vocals 
 Gary Sullivan - drums, assorted sounds 
 Jim Laing - guitar, vocals
 Nick Roughan - engineer
 Rob Pinder - producer

References

Jean-Paul Sartre Experience albums
Flying Nun Records albums